Monica Jones is an American sex work activist. While a student at Arizona State University, Jones, who is an African American transgender woman, campaigned against police sting operations against prostitutes, which are aided by the ASU School of Social work and religious charities.

Sex work activism
One day after speaking at a protest against a Phoenix law which allows police to arrest anyone suspected of "manifesting prostitution", Jones accepted a ride home after visiting a bar. The undercover police officer driving the car arrested her under the law that she had been protesting. The American Civil Liberties Union of Arizona has filed an amicus curiae for Jones, arguing that the law is "unconstitutionally vague and overbroad". Jones pleaded not guilty to the charge and was sentenced to 30 days in prison and a $500 fine.

Laverne Cox and Janet Mock joined a campaign against the Phoenix law, which they argue targets transgender women of color, following the conviction of Jones. Cox stated, "All over the country, trans women are targeted simply for being who they are. Laws like this manifestation law really support systematically the idea that girls like me, girls like me and Monica, are less than [others] in this country". Mock tweeted, "Speak against the profiling of [trans woman of color], like Monica Jones".

Jones and her lawyer, Jean-Jacques Cabou, appealed the case and it was dropped in January 2015. The court found that she had had an unfair trial, given that the lower court had allowed evidence of past prostitution convictions in order to discredit her. The law remained on the books after Jones' case was dropped.

Australian deportation
In November 2014, Jones was detained in Villawood Immigration Detention Centre after the Department of Immigration and Border Protection cancelled her tourist visa at Sydney Airport. Jones had admitted to having offered sexual services while in the country. Although prostitution was legal, Jones was accused of breaching her visa work conditions, which did not entitle her "to engage in any activity that included the sale of goods and services to the general public." Jones was taken to court and made a bid to stay, and lost. She agreed to voluntarily leave the country, but planned to challenge Australia's Immigration Department over allegations of procedural unfairness in court. Jones commented that producers for the Australian TV show Border Security "knew details of what Immigration was going to do to me" and that "It was about 30 seconds before the cameras showed up... and tried to get me on their TV show". Jones was asked by an immigration officer "Are you OK if they continue to film?" when she had already demanded that the TV cameras leave.

See also
LGBT rights in the United States

References

American LGBT rights activists
LGBT people from Arizona
Transgender women
Transgender law in the United States
Living people
Year of birth missing (living people)